Dōshi Club may refer to:

Dōshi Seisha, a defunct political party in Japan initially known as Dōshi Club
Dōshi Club (1900s), a defunct political party in Japan
Dōshi Club (1947–48), a defunct political party in Japan